Nephew Tommy's Prank Phone Calls: Volume 2 is the second album by comedian Nephew Tommy.

Track listing
Intro - 2:23
Snitchen - 6:10
Sneaking People Across the Border - 7:40
Unbeweavable - 5:57
Don't Mess Up My Moma's House - 7;42
You Can't Use the "N" Word - 6:00
Mister Wiggins - 5:50
You Can't Date Black Woman - 6:36
Your Wife Is My Brother Tim - 6:41
Child Support 101 - 8:05
The White Man That Lost It - 7:08
Guy Torry - 6:42
Outro - 0:57

2012 albums
Nephew Tommy albums
2010s comedy albums